Women Deliver is a global advocacy organization that works to generate political commitment and financial investment for fulfilling Millennium Development Goal 5, which is improving maternal health. This is a multifactorial approach, involving access to a healthy diet, clean water and sanitation, health services, and appropriate education during pregnancy and childbirth. Women Deliver is targeted towards reducing maternal mortality, achieving universal access to reproductive health, and improving the lives of girls and women globally.

Profile and history
Women Deliver was founded by Jill Sheffield in 2007. That same year, it officially launched at its groundbreaking Women Deliver conference. This conference convened nearly 2,000 clinicians, advocates, policymakers, and businesspeople involved in maternal and reproductive health. Since then, the nongovernmental organization has built on commitments, partnerships, and networks mobilized at the conference to keep the preventable tragedy of maternal health on the global policy agenda and to find solutions across sectors to make safe motherhood a reality for all women. At its heart, Women Deliver's message is that maternal health is both a human right and practical necessity for sustainable development. This is echoed by the group's name and slogan: “Invest in women, it pays.”

Women Deliver Conferences 
The first Women Deliver conference was held in London in October 2007. Nearly 2,000 participants (advocates, researchers, policymakers, and global leaders) from 115 countries attended. The conference marked the 20th anniversary of the Safe Motherhood Initiative to support investment in maternal and newborn health.

On June 7 to June 9, 2010, Women Deliver hosted a second global conference in Washington, D.C., drawing nearly 3,500 attendees from 146 countries. The meeting allowed organizations and stakeholders to share best practices and lessons learned and reinvigorate the fight for better health for girls and women.

Women Deliver's third global conference, Women Deliver 2013, was held in Kuala Lumpur, Malaysia, from May 28–30, 2013. With more than 4,500 participants from 149 countries, the conference was the largest meeting of the decade to focus on the health and empowerment of girls and women. Participants gave over 800 speeches and presentations at the six plenaries and 120 breakout sessions. The program featured issues related to the health and well-being of girls and women, with a particular focus on the post-2015 development framework.

Women Deliver 2013 attracted media attention from all over the globe. There were 415 journalists on-site at the conference, and hundreds more followed the meeting via the Women Deliver 2013 webcast. The conference resulted in more than 1,500 articles written in global media about girls' and women's health and rights.

The fourth Women Deliver's global conference was held in Copenhagen from 16–19 May 2016 following the Sustainable Development Goals (SDGs) launch. The conference's focus was on implementing the SDGs as they relate to girls and women, with a specific emphasis on health – in particular maternal, sexual, and reproductive health and rights – and the inter-connections with gender equality, education, environment, and economic empowerment.

The 2019 conference was held in Vancouver, Canada, 2–6 June.

Women Deliver's approach
Women Deliver fights for greater investment, increased political will, and overall improved health for girls and women. It raises awareness by highlighting research and field projects, training youth advocates, engaging policymakers and the private sector on maternal health issues, and creating spaces for collaboration and idea generation.

100 Young Leaders Program
As a part of the global Women Deliver 2010 conference, Women Deliver selected 100 Young Leaders from a pool of 6,000 scholarship applicants, representing 59 different countries. For the 2013 conference, the 100 Young Leaders represented 68 different countries. These young leaders were chosen based on their knowledge, skills, and experience in advocating for reproductive health and rights, as well as on their potential to increase advocacy efforts in their local communities.

Each of the 100 Young Leaders is awarded a full scholarship to attend the Women Deliver 2013 conference in Kuala Lumpur, Malaysia where they had the opportunity to network and engage with other global leaders advocating for reproductive health and rights. In addition to funding the young leaders to attend their conferences, Women Deliver also works with youth to help refine their communications and advocacy skills. Women Deliver young leaders often engage in traditional and social media activities to help bring heightened attention to their role in the international development sector.

Women Deliver Global Campaigns
Women Deliver 50

Every year on International Women's Day, Women Deliver celebrates global progress for girls and women. The “Women Deliver 50” was compiled in 2012 to recognize research, programs, and initiatives improving the status of girls and women. Choosing from hundreds of submissions from 103 countries, a selection committee of leading experts and advocates in women's health and rights narrowed the applications to 125 finalists. These finalists were posted online, and more than 6,000 individuals voted to select the top fifty most inspiring ideas and solutions.

Women Deliver 100

In 2011, in honor of the 100th Anniversary of International Women's Day, Women Deliver announced the “Women Deliver 100”. The list featured individuals from a wide range of backgrounds, including health, human rights, politics, economics, education, journalism, and philanthropy, and from all over the world.

Global Solution Awards

In the lead-up to its third global conference, Women Deliver launched a Social Enterprise Challenge to recognize social enterprises around the world making a positive difference.

During the first round of the selection process, Women Deliver worked with Echoing Green to select 25 entries from the semifinalists of the Echoing Green Fellowship Program. To determine the top ten enterprises, Women Deliver opened voting online and voters selected their top three social enterprises. The ten enterprises that received the most votes were awarded a full scholarship to attend the Women Deliver 2013 conference.

The expert judges included Daniel Rostrup, Outreach Manager for TrustLaw Connect; Josh Nesbit, CEO of Medic Mobile; Amanda Chen, Associate Director of Commitments & Head of Global Health at the Clinton Global Initiative; Jackline (Jackie) Fesi Mupenzi, Advocacy and Policy Manager at Sustainable Health Enterprises (SHE); and Sweta Mangal, CEO of Ziqitza Health Care Limited. Rachel Zedeck, Founder of Backpack Farm, facilitated the sessions.

The winner of the first edition were New Incentives, Black Girls Code and Wedu. Winners were awarded the “Global Solution Award” and recognized during the closing plenary at Women Deliver 2013. They were given a cash prize to put towards their enterprises.

“It Takes Two” Campaign

During the first day of the Women Deliver 2013 conference, Women Deliver announced a campaign with the Global Poverty Project called “It Takes Two.” The campaign focuses on family planning and aims to raise awareness of and improve access to family planning. Initially launched in the United States and Uganda, the campaign will expand to other countries over the course of three years. Partners of “It Takes Two” include International Planned Parenthood Federation (IPPF), The Bill and Melinda Gates Institute for Population and Reproductive Health, UNFPA, Marie Stopes International, and others, and product partners of the campaign include Karex and The Female Health Company.

C-Exchange
The C-Exchange is a private sector forum that serves as a platform for members of both the public and private sectors to collaborate on efforts to advance the health and well-being of girls and women. Convening corporate representatives together and leaders of non-governmental organizations, the C-Exchange aims to improve the status of girls and women by addressing key gaps in health programming for women and girls; building strong coalitions; and creating innovative projects and campaigns.

Since 2013, the C-Exchange has focused on an initiative to improve maternal and reproductive health by working with youth advocates from developing countries. Launched at Women Deliver 2013, the C-Exchange Youth Initiative combines the expertise of the private sector and the capacity of young people to:

 Strengthen the advocacy capacities of young, developing-country leaders in Africa and Asia;
 Develop and disseminate online resources designed to expand the knowledge base of young leaders concerning the key issues in reproductive and maternal health;
 Increase knowledge of the reproductive and maternal health needs of women and girls among a broader audience by assisting the youth leaders in developing and implementing communications campaigns;
 Provide vital opportunities for young people to engage with the private sector leaders, as well as key decision-makers from their own countries.

Regional consultations
Over the course of 2012 and 2013, Women Deliver organized a series of four regional consultations for experts, advocates, researchers, and policymakers to discuss maternal and reproductive health issues both specific to their region and within a global context. The consultations were invite-only, and focused on sub-Saharan Africa, Latin America and the Caribbean, Asia, and the Middle East and North Africa. Participants framed conversations and outcomes within the frameworks International Conference on Population and Development's (ICPD) Plan of Action and Millennium Development Goal (MDG) 5. Women Deliver used the outcomes and recommendations from each consultation to compile a final report. The report was sent to the United Nations Secretary-General office and has been taken into consideration during the creation of the post-2015 international development agenda.

Catapult
In 2012, Women Deliver launched Catapult, a crowdfunding platform for projects that accelerate progress on issues impacting girls and women. The site features not-for-profit organizations from all over the world, and anyone can donate to the project. All organizations on Catapult have a clear focus on gender issues.

Publications
 Focus on 5: Women's Health and the MDGs (translations available)
 Why It's the Right Time: Moving on Reproductive Health Goals by Focusing on Adolescent Girls
 Targeting poverty and gender inequality to improve maternal health

References

Organizations established in 2007
Women's health